Teseo Tesei (3 January 1909 – 26 July 1941) was an Italian naval officer, who invented the human torpedo (called Maiale, Italian for "pig") used by the Regia Marina during World War II.

Life

Teseo Tesei was born in Marina de Campo, Elba in 1909, the son of Ulisse Tesey and Rosa Carassale. After attending the Collegio degli Scolopi in Florence, he entered the Livorno Naval Academy in 1931, where he distinguished himself for perseverance and inventiveness. He was commissioned as a lieutenant and graduated from the Naval engineering school in Naples in 1933. He subsequently had several posts on both surface ships and submarines. He was a volunteer in the Spanish Civil War with the rank of captain.

In 1929, Tesei had the idea for the manned torpedo, from the Italian device used to sink the Austrian battleship SMS Viribus Unitis during World War I. 
In 1931 he entered the Naval Academy of Livorno, where he showed his inventive capabilities. Together with Elios Toschi he designed a human torpedo called Siluro a lenta corsa (SLC) ("Slow-Run Torpedo"), later nicknamed the Maiale, Italian for "pig", because it proved to be difficult to steer. The SLC was extensively used in World War II by the Italian Navy, and was used in the sinking of two British battleships in Alexandria. The British later developed their own manned torpedo model, called "Chariot", from one of his captured "Maiali".
1936: Working with Angelo Belloni he designed the high-performance closed-circuit self-contained breathing apparatus that was used by the italian underwater raiders during their WW2 operations, and that heavily influenced the following german and british wartime rebreathers design. 
1938: He was one of the officers who organized the Decima Flottiglia MAS underwater raiders unit of the Italian Navy.
21 August 1940: Tesei was the only survivor when the Italian submarine Iride was sunk (see Decima Flottiglia MAS#1940).
26 July 1941: Tesei died in action during a manned torpedo attack on Malta (see Decima Flottiglia MAS#1941), for which he was posthumously awarded the Italian Gold Medal of Military Valour.

The modern Italian commando frogmen group Comando Raggruppamento Subacquei ed Incursori Teseo Tesei (COMSUBIN) is named after him.

See also
Decima Flottiglia MAS
Battle of the Mediterranean

References
Historical Diving Times, pp 6–11, issue 39.

Bibliography

 Greene, Jack The Black Prince and the Sea Devils: The Story of Valerio Borghese and the Elite Units of the Decima Mas. Da Capo Press. Cambridge/Mass., 2004 
 Schofield, William. Frogmen First Battles. New York, 2000 

1909 births
1941 deaths
Armed forces diving
20th-century Italian inventors
Italian military personnel killed in World War II
Italian underwater divers
People from the Province of Livorno
Regia Marina personnel of World War II
History of scuba diving